USS Hemminger (DE-746) was a  in service with the United States Navy from 1944 to 1946 and from 1950 to 1958. In 1959, she was transferred to Thailand, where she serves as HTMS Pin Klao. She is the only  still in service.

History

United States Navy (1944-1958)
USS Hemminger was named in honor of Cyril Franklin Hemminger who was killed during the Battle of Savo Island. The ship was launched on 12 September 1943 by the Western Pipe and Steel Company, San Francisco, California; sponsored by Mrs. Sue Frances Hemminger, widow; and commissioned on 30 May 1944.

World War II
With the ship's shakedown completed, Hemminger reached Pearl Harbor in August 1944 to train submarines for war patrols. She also patrolled between Pearl and Eniwetok and worked in hunter-killer antisubmarine operations. After patrol duty in the Marshall Islands, Hemminger sailed on 30 April to escort a resupply convoy to Okinawa, where battle still raged. From 16 May to 20 June, she acted as screen for a carrier group engaged in neutralization of Sakishima Gunto and supported ground forces on Okinawa, as well as the air attack on Kyūshū.

Detached from the Pacific Fleet, Hemminger reached Norfolk, Virginia, on 2 December via Saipan, Pearl Harbor, San Diego, California, and the Panama Canal. Training out of Green Cove Springs, Florida, occupied Hemminger until she decommissioned there on 17 June 1946 and went into reserve.

Cold War 
 
After a period of duty with the reserve training program, Hemminger recommissioned at Norfolk, Virginia, on 1 December 1950. In the following years her career assumed a pattern of local operations along the coast punctuated by reserve training cruises to Canada and the Caribbean. One reserve cruise in June 1952 took Hemminger to Lisbon, Portugal, while others saw her at Rouen, France; Barranquilla, Colombia; Cadiz, Spain, and New Orleans, Louisiana.
 
Departing Little Creek, Virginia, on 23 November 1957 she reported to New York Naval Shipyard for inactivation.

Royal Thai Navy (1959-present)
Hemminger decommissioned there on 21 February 1958 and joined the Atlantic Reserve Fleet. She was loaned to Thailand on 22 July 1959 under the Military Assistance Program, and serves the Royal Thai Navy as HTMS Pin Klao (DE-1/DE-3/413).

Awards

References

External links

 

Cannon-class destroyer escorts of the United States Navy
Ships built in San Francisco
1943 ships
World War II frigates and destroyer escorts of the United States
Ships transferred from the United States Navy to the Royal Thai Navy